Luboš Adamec (born 18 April 1959 in Ústí nad Orlicí) is a Czech sport shooter. He competed at the Summer Olympics in 1988 and 1992. In 1988, he tied for 27th place in the mixed skeet event, and in 1992, he tied for 11th place in the mixed skeet event.

References

1959 births
Living people
Skeet shooters
Czech male sport shooters
Shooters at the 1988 Summer Olympics
Shooters at the 1992 Summer Olympics
Olympic shooters of Czechoslovakia
People from Ústí nad Orlicí
Sportspeople from the Pardubice Region